McDonald Township may refer to the following townships in the United States:

 McDonald Township, Barry County, Missouri
 McDonald Township, Hardin County, Ohio